Therese Schachner (1869-1950) was an Austrian artist.

Biography 
Schachner was born on 29 May 1869 in Vienna, the daughter of architect . She was a student of the Austrian landscape painter Hugo Darnaut. She also studied with Albin Egger-Lienz.

Schachner died on 5 May 1950 in Vienna. Her work is in the collection of the Belvedere Gallery.

Gallery

References

External links

1869 births
1950 deaths
Artists from Vienna
20th-century Austrian women artists